Gary Collins, formerly referred to as Gary Farrell-Collins prior to 2001 (born August 22, 1963), is a Canadian former politician, who served as a BC Liberal Member of the Legislative Assembly of British Columbia from 1991 to 2004, representing the riding of Vancouver-Fairview. He resigned in December 2004 to become CEO of the now defunct Harmony Airways.

In opposition, Collins served as Official Opposition House Leader and held a variety of critic roles. When the Liberals formed government in 2001, he served in Gordon Campbell's cabinet as Minister of Finance and Government House Leader.
 
Prior to his election to the Legislative Assembly, Collins was a flight instructor at the University College of the Fraser Valley. He studied economics and political science at Simon Fraser University.  He was first elected under the name Gary Farrell-Collins, but dropped his former wife's last name after his divorce.

Electoral record

References

External links
Gary Farrell-Collins

1963 births
British Columbia Liberal Party MLAs
Living people
Finance ministers of British Columbia
Members of the Executive Council of British Columbia
People from Moose Jaw
Politicians from Vancouver
21st-century Canadian politicians